James D. Pillen (born December 31, 1955) is an American politician, veterinarian and livestock producer serving as the 41st and current governor of Nebraska since 2023. A member of the Republican Party, Pillen served on the Nebraska State Board of Regents from 2013 to 2023.

Early life and education 
Pillen was born in Columbus, Nebraska. After graduating from Lakeview Junior-Senior High School in 1974, he earned a Bachelor of Science degree in animal science from the University of Nebraska–Lincoln and a Doctor of Veterinary Medicine from the Kansas State University College of Veterinary Medicine.

From 1975 to 1978, Pillen was a defensive back for the Nebraska Cornhuskers football team under Tom Osborne. He was inducted into the Nebraska Football Hall of Fame in 2004.

Career 
Pillen is a practicing veterinarian and also works as chair of Pillen Family Farms. The business, which employs members of Pillen's family, acquired DNA Genetics in 2003. Pillen has also worked as president of the Columbus Area Chamber of Commerce and chaired the Columbus Community Hospital Board of Directors. He has served on the University of Nebraska Board of Regents (which governs the University of Nebraska System) since 2012, and as vice-chair and chair in 2018 and 2020, respectively.

Pillen was the Republican nominee in the 2022 Nebraska gubernatorial election. During the Republican primary election, he refused to debate his primary rivals. Pillen was endorsed by incumbent Governor Pete Ricketts and former Governor Kay A. Orr. In a crowded field of primary candidates, Pillen won the nomination with about 33.75% of the vote, defeating Charles Herbster (who received 30.13%), Brett Lindstrom (25.68%), and Theresa Thibodeau (6.05%). Pillen's running mate was former U.S. Attorney Joseph P. Kelly. Pillen campaigned on opposing abortion and critical race theory. In the general election, he refused to debate the Democratic nominee, Carol Blood.

Pillen was elected governor with 59.9% of the vote to Blood's 36.1% and Libertarian nominee Scott Zimmerman's 4%. He took office on January 5, 2023. One week after being sworn in, he appointed his predecessor, Pete Ricketts, to the United States Senate seat left vacant by the resignation of Ben Sasse to become president of the University of Florida.

Governor of Nebraska

Elections
2022

Incumbent Republican Governor Pete Ricketts was term-limited and unable to seek a third term. Pillen won the gubernatorial election by a 23-point margin.

Nebraska's primary elections were held on May 10. Pillen won the Republican nomination, while state senator Carol Blood won the Democratic nomination. 

The race took on increased importance in October 2022, when U.S. Senator Ben Sasse announced he would resign and Ricketts said he would allow the winner of the 2022 gubernatorial election to appoint Sasse's replacement. Pillen appointed Ricketts to replace Sasse.

Tenure

Personal life 
Pillen and his wife, Suzanne, have four children and seven grandchildren. Pillen is a Roman Catholic.

Electoral history

2022 election

References

External links 

|-

|-

|-

|-

 

 

1955 births
American veterinarians
Kansas State University alumni
Living people
Nebraska Cornhuskers football players
People from Columbus, Nebraska
People from Platte County, Nebraska
Republican Party governors of Nebraska